Damdiny Süldbayar (born July 1, 1981) is a Mongolian judoka who competed in the men's lightweight category. He competed at the 2002 Asian Games, but lost the bronze medal match in the Men's 73 kg event to Egamnazar Akbarov of Uzbekistan. However, the following year he won the bronze medal at the 2003 Asian Judo Championships. At the 2004 Summer Olympic Games he was defeated in the quarter-finals.

He competed in his first MMA bout in Cagezilla 52, where he won the fight via KO in the first round.

References

External links
 

Mongolian male judoka
1981 births
Living people
Judoka at the 2004 Summer Olympics
Olympic judoka of Mongolia
Judoka at the 2002 Asian Games
Asian Games competitors for Mongolia
20th-century Mongolian people
21st-century Mongolian people